Castalia martensi is a species of freshwater mussel in the family Hyriidae. It is endemic to Brazil.

References

Hyriidae
Molluscs of Brazil
Endemic fauna of Brazil
Taxonomy articles created by Polbot
Molluscs described in 1891